The following buildings were added to the National Register of Historic Places as part of the Tarpon Springs Sponge Boats Multiple Property Submission (or MPS).

Notes

 Pinellas
National Register of Historic Places Multiple Property Submissions in Florida
Tarpon Springs, Florida